is the name of the traditional Japanese children's tune (warabe uta). It is a common choice for music played by traffic lights in Japan when it is safe to cross. Tōryanse can be heard in many forms of popular culture, such as at crosswalks in anime.

Lyrics

The words to the song are:

Tune

Explanation

There are many theories to the origin of the song, but all agree that it is a portrayal of an exchange between a civilian and a guard manning some sort of a checkpoint – at Kawagoe Castle according to one theory. In the old days when infant mortality was high, people celebrated when a child survived to reach the age of 7 (as well as 3 and 5; see Shichi-Go-San), and ordinary people were only allowed to visit the shrine within the castle compound for special occasions.

This particular warabe uta is sung as part of a traditional game where two children facing each other link their hands to form an arch 'checkpoint', and the remaining children walk through underneath in a line (and back round again in circles). The child who happens to be under the arch when the song finishes is then 'caught', not unlike the Anglophone game "London Bridge Is Falling Down".

The tune being played at Japanese pedestrian crossings is an analogy to this game, i.e., it is safe to cross until the music stops.

See also 
 Warabe uta
Kagome Kagome

References

External links
A "musicbox" midi file of Toryanse
A midi file at Music Laboratory Database
About Shichi-go-san, The 7 - 5 - 3 Festival in Japan and Tooryanse
A short video of it being played at a crosswalk

Japanese songs
Japanese-language songs
Japanese children's songs
Year of song unknown
Songwriter unknown